Perry Stone is an American radio personality, disc jockey and shock jock.

KSJO controversy
In 1989, Stone was fired from San Jose, California radio station KSJO after verbal harassment of two Brownies, telling one nine-year-old to keep Girl Scout Cookie money, on his March 10, 1989, show, it cost him a suspension.

A second incident on the same day, involving a teenage girl that wrote a letter to Stone, may have been more serious, KSJO attorney Michael Hurley said at a news conference.  The girl's angry mother wrote a letter to station manager David Baronfeld and demanded a retraction. Stone returned to KSJO to record the retraction and the broadcast was the last time Stone was heard on the station.

Stone's on-air radio sidekick while working at KSJO was Trish Bell.

References

External links
UNT Digital Library

American talk radio hosts
Living people
Shock jocks
Year of birth missing (living people)